Endlich allein (Alone at Last) is an operetta by composer Franz Lehár. It uses a German language libretto by A. M. Willner and Robert Bodanzky. It premiered on 30 January 1914 at the Theater an der Wien. 

The stars were Gitta Alpar and Richard Tauber, who recorded several excerpts for the Odeon Records company.

Roles

Recordings
Lehár: Schön ist die Welt, Munich Radio Orchestra
Conductor: Ulf Schirmer
Principal singers: Elena Mosuc, Isabella Stettner, Masako Goda, Andreas Hirtreiter, Roland Kandlbinder
Recording date: 2004
Label: CPO Records 777 055-2 (CD)

References
Notes

Sources

1914 operas
German-language operettas
Operas by Franz Lehár
Operas